In molecular biology, the protein domain WHEP-TRS refers to helix-turn-helix domains. They are found in variable numbers in glutamyl-prolyl tRNA synthetase (EPRS). This protein domain has an important function in protein–protein interactions between synthetases. WHEP domains exhibit high-affinity interactions with tRNA, indicating a putative evolutionary relationship to facilitate tRNA binding to fused synthetases, thereby enhancing catalytic efficiency.

Protein interactions
EPRS is a component of the interferon-gamma-activated inhibitor of translation (GAIT) complex, which interacts with stem-loop elements (GAIT elements) in mRNAs encoding proinflammatory proteins, for example, vascular endothelial growth factor-A (VEGFA). WHEP domains interact with the GAIT element in the 3′UTR of target mRNAs and with the regulatory protein NS1-associated protein-1 (NSAP1).

Structure
A conserved domain of 46 amino acids, called WHEP-TRS has been shown to exist in a number of higher eukaryote aminoacyl-transfer RNA synthetases. This domain is present one to six times in several enzymes. There are three copies in mammalian aminoacyl-tRNA synthetase in a region that separates the N-terminal glutamyl-tRNA synthetase domain from the C-terminal prolyl-tRNA synthetase domain, and six copies in the intercatalytic region of the Drosophila enzyme. The domain is found at the N-terminal extremity of the mammalian tryptophanyl- tRNA synthetase and histidyl-tRNA synthetase, and the mammalian, insect, nematode and plant glycyl- tRNA synthetases.

References

Protein families